So Joo-yeon (born December 31, 1993) is a South Korean model and actress. She starred in the Korean television series Dr. Romantic 2 (2020).

Early life
Joo-yeon was born on December 31, 1993, in Singil-dong, Seoul, South Korea.

Career

2018–present: Modelling and acting debut
Joo-yeon is a model under LSAC Model. She made her acting film debut in  The Whispering and the television series Not Alright, But It's Alright. She had lead roles in My Healing Love and I Hate Going To Work. She was also cast in Wild Guys. In 2020, So played the role of Yoon Ah-reum in Dr. Romantic 2 alongside Han Suk-kyu, Lee Sung-kyung, Ahn Hyo-seop, Kim Min-jae and more.

Filmography

Film

Television series

Web series

Awards and nominations

References

External links

 Official website 
 

1993 births
Living people
South Korean female models
South Korean television actresses
South Korean film actresses
South Korean web series actresses
21st-century South Korean actresses